Bentara Budaya Yogyakarta is a cultural center located in Yogyakarta, Indonesia. Bentara Budaya Yogyakarta was opened on 26 September 1982, funded by Kompas Gramedia Group.

Bentara Budaya Yogyakarta is the Jakarta branch of Bentara Budaya, a cultural institution managed by Kompas Gramedia Group which also has several cultural centers in Jakarta, Surakarta (as Balai Soedjatmoko), and Bali.

References

External links 
 Bentara Budaya official website

Cultural centers in Indonesia